Southeast University Chengxian College station is a station of Line 3 of the Nanjing Metro. It started operations on 1 April 2015. The Southeast University Chengxian College campus is located to the southwest of the station.

References

Railway stations in Jiangsu
Railway stations in China opened in 2015
Nanjing Metro stations